Taher (spelled Tahir and Tahar in English and French, Тагир in Russian; Pashto,Urdu and Persian: طاهر,) is a name meaning "pure" or "virtuous". The origin of this name is Arabic. There are several Semitic variations that include connotations given in Africa, Asia, and Europe. It is traditionally a given name in Muslim and Jewish communities originating from the Middle East and Africa.

Notable people with the name include:

Given name

Tahar 
 Tahar Ben Jelloun (b. 1944), Moroccan writer
 Tahar Djaout (1954–1993), Algerian journalist and writer
 Tahar Haddad (1899–1935), Tunisian author, scholar and reformer
 Tahar Lamri (b.1958), Algerian writer
 Tahar Rahim (b. 1981), French actor
 Tahar Sayagh (b. 1995), French IT engineer
 Tahar Touati (b. 1995), Algerian engineer

Taher
Taher Abouzeid (born 1962), Egyptian politician and minister
Taher Badakhshi (1933–1979), cultural and political Tajik activist in Afghanistan
Taher Elgamal (born 1955), Egyptian cryptographer
Taher Helmy, Egyptian lawyer
Taher Kaboutari (born 1985), Iranian rower
Taher al-Masri (born 1942), Jordanian politician
Taher Mohamed (born 1997), Egyptian footballer
Taher Sabahi (born 1940), Iranian art dealer, journalist, author
Syedna Taher Saifuddin (1888–1965), Dawoodi Bohra religious leader
Taher Zakaria (born 1988), Qatari footballer

Tahir
 Abdallah ibn Muhammad, also known as Tahir was the son of Islamic prophet Muhammad.
Tahir ibn Husayn, general of the Abbasid caliph al-Ma'mun and governor of Khorasan.
 Tahir ibn Abdallah, governor of Khurasan from 845 until 862.
Mirza Tahir Ahmad, fourth Khalifa of Islam Ahmadiyyat
Tahir (Indonesian businessman), founder of the Mayapada Group
Tahir Aslam Gora, Pakistani-Canadian author and activist
Tahir Akyurek, Turkish politician
Tahir Bilgiç, Australian comedian of Turkish descent
Tahir Dawar, Pakistani police officer and Pashto poet of Pashtun descent
Tahir "Tie" Domi, Canadian NHL hockey player
Tahir Khan, Pakistani cricketer
Tahir Pasha (disambiguation), several people
Tahir-ul-Qadri, Pakistani Islamic scholar
Sheikh Muhammad Tahir Rasheed, Pakistani politician
Artur Tahir oğlu Rasizada, Prime Minister of Azerbaijan
Tahir Salahov, Azerbaijani painter and draughtsman
Tahir Yahya, Iraqi politician
 Tahir bin Mandir, better known as Harun Thohir or Harun Said, Indonesian soldier and terrorist who carried out the MacDonald House bombing on 10 March 1965

Middle name

Taher
Mohammad Taher Khaqani (1940), Grand Ayatollah and Shia scholar
Muhammed Taher Pasha (1879–1970), Egyptian political scientist of Turkish origin 
Yahya Taher Abdullah (1938–1981), Egyptian writer

Surname

Taher
Abu Taher (c. 1932–2004) Bangladeshi industrialist and politician
Ali Jawad Al Taher (1911?/ 1922? – 1996), Iraqi critic and literary scholar
Ayman Taher (born 1966), Egyptian football player 
Bahaa Taher (born 1935), Egyptian novelist
Moeslim Taher, Indonesian education figure who founded Jayabaya University
Nahed Taher, Saudi businesswoman
Tareq Mubarak Taher (born 1986), birth name Dennis Kipkurui Sang, Kenyan-born Bahraini long-distance runner
Tarmizi Taher (1936–2013), Indonesian politician and minister
Yaqoub Al Taher (born 1983), Kuwaiti football player 
Yaseinn Taher, Yemeni-American terror suspect
Ymär Daher, Finnish Tatar cultural figure

Tahir
Bedriye Tahir, Turkish aviator
Faran Tahir, Pakistani-American film and television actor
Imran Tahir, South African cricketer
Kemal Tahir, Turkish novelist and intellectual
Malika Tahir, French figure skater
Mehmet Tahir, Ottoman-era publisher
Naqaash Tahir, English cricketer
Sabaa Tahir, Pakistani-American author

Thohir
Erick Thohir, Indonesian businessman and President of Inter Milan
Harun Thohir, Indonesian marine and saboteur during Konfrontasi

Teknonymy

Abu Tahir Ibrahim ibn Nasir al-Dawla, 10th-century Ruler of Mosul from 989 to 990.
Abu Tahir al-Silafi, (1079–1180) Islamic Scholar.
Abu Tahir Marwazi, 12th-century Iranian philosopher.
Abu Tahir Yazid, 10th-century Ruler of Shirvan from 917–948.
 Abu Tahir Firuzshah better known by his title Diya al-Dawla, was the Buyid ruler of Basra in late 10th-century.
 Abu Tahir al-Jannabi was the Qarmatian Shia rebel Ruler from 923 to 944.
 Abu Tahir Tarsusi, 12th-century story-teller and writer.

See also
Tahira
Islamic hygienical jurisprudence
Tair (disambiguation)

References

Arabic-language surnames
Arabic masculine given names
Bosniak masculine given names
Turkish-language surnames
Turkish masculine given names